The Fairview Inn is a historic hotel building on Main Street in the center of Talkeetna, Alaska, United States.  It is a two-story frame structure, with a hip roof.  The main block,  square, was built between 1920 and 1923, following the arrival in the area of the Alaska Railroad.  The building exterior is little-altered since then; its major modification has been the addition in the 1970s of an addition for owner living quarters. The interior also still follows essentially the same floor plan as when it was built.

The building was listed on the National Register of Historic Places in 1982 and was added as a contributing property to Talkeetna Historic District in 1993.

See also
 National Register of Historic Places listings in Matanuska-Susitna Borough, Alaska

References

Buildings and structures completed in 1923
Hotel buildings on the National Register of Historic Places in Alaska
Buildings and structures on the National Register of Historic Places in Matanuska-Susitna Borough, Alaska
Individually listed contributing properties to historic districts on the National Register in Alaska